K. A. Francis  is a Malayali painter and the Chairman of Kerala Lalitakala Academy (2011 -).

Life

He works as the editor of Malayala Manorama Weekly, the largest circulated weekly in India. Francis won several awards including Kerala Lalithkala Academy award for best landscape painting and National Award for newspaper layout and design.

External links

References 

Malayali people
20th-century Indian painters
Painters from Kerala
Artists from Kottayam
Living people
Indian male painters
Year of birth missing (living people)
20th-century Indian male artists